This is a list of albums that charted in the top ten of the ARIA Album Charts, an all-genre albums chart, in 2020.

Top-ten albums
The list is sorted chronologically by issue date with the date representing the first issue in which the album appeared in the top ten in 2020, regardless of whether an album charted in a previous year or not. Dates reached peak position are in 2020 unless otherwise noted.

An asterisk (*) represents that an album is still in the top-ten as of the issue dated 7 December 2020.

Entries by artist
The following table shows artists who achieved two or more top 10 entries in 2020.

See also 

 2020 in music
 ARIA Charts
 List of number-one albums of 2020 (Australia)
 List of top 10 singles in 2020 (Australia)

References 

2020 in Australian music
Australia Albums Top 10
Australian record charts